The Maharashtra Bhushan  is a highest civilian award presented annually by the Government of Maharashtra State in India.

When the Shivsena- BJP alliance came to power in 1995, it proposed to institute this award. The Maharashtra Bhushan was first awarded in 1996. It was initially conferred in every years in the fields of Literature, Art, Sport, and Science. Later the fields of Social Work, Journalism,  and Public Administration and Health Services were included. The award is presented for outstanding achievement in their field.

Prize and selection
At present, the award carries a cash prize of  25 lakhs, a memento and citation. The winners are selected by a committee appointed of the Government of Maharashtra.

Recipients
The recipients of the Maharashtra Bhushan award are as follows

See also
 Uttarakhand Gaurav Samman

References

 
Civil awards and decorations of Maharashtra